Blackjack: The Jackie Ryan Story is a 2020 American biographical sports drama film directed by Danny A. Abeckaser and starring Greg Finley as Brooklyn-based streetball player Jack Ryan.

Cast
Ashley Greene as Jenny Burke
Greg Finley as Jackie Ryan
Brandon Thomas Lee as Billy Ryan
David Arquette as Big Jack
Robert Davi as Father Brennan
Bo Dietl as Eddie Falcone
Tara Westwood as Susan Ryan
Sean Avery as Dino Garibaldi
James Madio as Marty Doyle
Michael Rapaport as Bill Fitch
Ben Lyons as Coach Carlisle
Moise Morancy as Gill Turner
Geoffrey Cantor as Peter Vecsey

The Harlem Wizards also appear in the film.

Release
It was announced that Gravitas Ventures acquired worldwide distribution rights to the film in May 2020.

The film was released on October 30, 2020.

Reception
Marina Gordon of Common Sense Media awarded the film two stars out of five and wrote, "Uneven basketball biopic has language, drinking, drugs.".

References

External links
 
 

2020s English-language films